The 2007 Atlantic Coast Conference baseball tournament was held at the Baseball Grounds of Jacksonville in Jacksonville, Florida, from May 23 through 27.  North Carolina won the tournament and earned the Atlantic Coast Conference's automatic bid to the 2007 NCAA Division I baseball tournament. This was the first year the conference used the round robin tournament setup. The best record of each group at the end of the round robin would face each other in a one-game match for the championship.

Seeding Procedure
From TheACC.com:
The top two teams from both the Atlantic and Coastal divisions, as determined by conference winning percentage, in addition to the four teams with the next best conference winning percentage, regardless of division, will be selected to participate in the ACC Baseball Championship. The two division champions will automatically be seeded number one and two based on winning percentage in overall conference competition. The remaining teams will be seeded (three through eight) based on winning percentage in overall conference competition without regard to division. All ties will be broken using the tie-breaking provisions .

Boston College, Duke, Maryland and Virginia Tech did not make the tournament.

Tournament

Florida State and North Carolina were Regular Season Division Champs
Wake Forest held the tie-breaker over Clemson by defeating them head-to-head 3-2
North Carolina held the tie-breaker over Virginia by defeating them head-to-head 5-0

All-Tournament Team

(*)Denotes Unanimous Selection

See also
College World Series
NCAA Division I Baseball Championship

References

TheACC.com 2007 Baseball Championship Info

Tournament
Atlantic Coast Conference baseball tournament
Atlantic Coast Conference baseball tournament
Atlantic Coast Conference baseball tournament
21st century in Jacksonville, Florida
Baseball competitions in Jacksonville, Florida
College baseball tournaments in Florida